Jared Valentine Peck (September 21, 1816 – December 25, 1891) was an American businessman and politician who served one term as a U.S. Representative from New York from 1853 to 1855.

Biography 
Born in Port Chester, New York, Peck attended the common schools. He engaged in the lumber, brick, hardware, and building-material business. He served as auditor for the town of Rye in 1844 and 1845.

Political career 
He was a member of the New York State Assembly (Westchester Co., 2nd D.) in 1848.

Congress 
Peck was elected as a Democrat to the Thirty-third Congress (March 4, 1853 – March 3, 1855). He was not a candidate for renomination in 1854.

Later career 
After leaving Congress, he resumed his former business pursuits. He was appointed warden of the port of New York by Governor Edwin D. Morgan in 1859, with residence in New York City, and served until 1865. He was one of the founders of the Union League Club.

He returned to Westchester County and settled in Rye where he served as member of the town board of auditors.

Death and burial 
He died in Rye, New York, December 25, 1891. He was interred in Greenwood Union Cemetery.

Sources

1816 births
1891 deaths
Democratic Party members of the United States House of Representatives from New York (state)
Democratic Party members of the New York State Assembly
19th-century American politicians